F174 may refer to:
 HMS Alacrity (F174), a Type 21 frigate of the Royal Navy
 Sinking of F174, the worst maritime disaster in the Mediterranean Sea since World War II